Richard Andrés Dorrego Coito (born 1 February 1995) is a Uruguayan footballer who plays as a midfielder for Cerro Largo in the Uruguayan Primera División.

References

External links
Profile at Football Database

1995 births
Living people
C.A. Progreso players
C.A. Rentistas players
Plaza Colonia players
Villa Española players
Cerro Largo F.C. players
Uruguayan Segunda División players
Uruguayan footballers
Association football midfielders